James Bowen may refer to:
James Bowen (Royal Navy officer) (1751–1835)
James Bowen (artist) (died 1774), English painter and topographer
James Barton Bowen (1815–1881), mayor of Madison, Wisconsin
James Bevan Bowen (MP) (1828–1905), British Member of Parliament for Pembrokeshire
James Bevan Bowen (RAF officer) (1883–1969)
James Bowen (railroad executive) (1808–1886), American railroad executive
James Bowen (author) (born 1979), author of A Street Cat Named Bob
James Bowen (footballer) (born 1996), English footballer
James Bowen (jockey), Welsh jockey
James M. Bowen (1793–1880), first owner of Mirador

See also
Jim Bowen (1937–2018), English stand-up comedian and television personality
Jimmy Bowen (born 1937), American record producer and rockabilly singer